Lac des Rousses is a lake in Les Rousses, Jura department, Franche-Comté, France, close to the Vallée de Joux in Switzerland. The lake drains through the Orbe (river) into Lac de Joux.

External links
Lac des Rousses 

Rousses
Les Rousses
L Lac des Rousses